The 1986 Benson & Hedges Championships was a tennis tournament played on indoor carpet courts at the Wembley Arena in London, England that was part of the 1986 Nabisco Grand Prix. It was the 11th edition of the tournament and was held from 10 November until 16 November 1986. Third-seeded Yannick Noah, who entered on a wildcard, won the singles title.

Finals

Singles
 Yannick Noah defeated  Jonas Svensson 6–4, 6–3, 6–7, 4–6, 7–5
 It was Noah's 2nd singles title of the year and the 19th of his career.

Doubles
 John McEnroe /  Peter Fleming defeated  Sherwood Stewart /  Kim Warwick 3–6, 7–6, 6–2

References

External links
 ITF tournament edition details

Benson and Hedges Championships
Wembley Championships
Benson and Hedges Championships
Benson and Hedges Championships
Benson and Hedges Championships
Tennis in London